Your Trading Edge Magazine is a bi-monthly magazine for traders and active investors covering CFDs, stocks, options, futures, forex and commodities.

History
YourTradingEdge (YTE) began as a customer newsletter for the Sydney Futures Exchange (SFE) in 1997. SFE then began professionally publishing it as a magazine.

In early 2001, YTE was acquired by MarketSource International. Many of the former contributors re-joined the new YTE during the first year, including highly respected industry identities Michael Pascoe and Dawn Bolton-Smith.

The magazine is distributed in Australia, New Zealand, Malaysia, Singapore, Hong Kong, Brunei and Indonesia, as well as the United Kingdom.

In 2006 the title was picked up by Australia's largest newsagency chain, Newslink. It was also picked up by Qantas, Virgin Blue, Air New Zealand and Singapore Airlines for distribution in their frequent flyer lounges.

In 2010 YTE launched its first digital edition on the BeBook e-reader, then later via Exact Editions and the Apple Store.

In 2017, YTE was relaunched and acquired by EOS Publications.

Content
 Technical analysis
 Fundamental commentary
 Market strategies
 Trading techniques
 Global market news
 Book & software reviews
 Trader profiles

Ownership
Your Trading Edge Magazine is published by EOS Publications in Melbourne.

References

External links
 YTE Magazine website
 YTE UK Magazine website

1997 establishments in Australia
Business magazines published in Australia
Bi-monthly magazines published in Australia
Magazines established in 1997
Magazines published in Sydney
Business newsletters
Magazines published in Melbourne